The 1998 Copa Norte was the second edition of a football competition held in Brazil. Featuring 8 clubs, Acre, Amapá, Amazonas, Maranhão, Pará, Piauí, Rondônia and Roraima with one vacancy. 

In the finals, Sampaio Corrêa defeated São Raimundo 3–0 on penalties after tied 2–2 on aggregate to win their first title and earn the right to play in the 1998 Copa CONMEBOL.

Qualified teams

Bracket

Finals

Tied 2–2 on aggregate, Sampaio Corrêa won on penalties.

References

Copa Norte
1998
1998 in Brazilian football